Transportation in Philadelphia involves the various modes of transport within the city and its required infrastructure. In addition to facilitating intracity travel, Philadelphia's transportation system connects Philadelphia to towns of its metropolitan area and surrounding areas within the Northeast megalopolis.

The city is crossed by the Delaware Expressway (Interstate 95 or I-95) and the Schuylkill Expressway (I-76), which are the principal thoroughfares for intercity traffic. The Vine Street Expressway (I-676) travels between I-76 and I-95 in Center City Philadelphia, and the Roosevelt Boulevard (U.S. Route 1) carries crosstown traffic in northern Philadelphia.

Philadelphia's public transit system is mainly operated by the Southeast Pennsylvania Transportation Authority (SEPTA), which maintains an extensive system utilizing buses, rapid transit, commuter rail, trolleys, and the Philadelphia trackless trolley (trolleybus) system. The main rail station of Philadelphia is 30th Street Station, which has access to 13 SEPTA Regional Rail routes and 11 Amtrak intercity rail routes. Philadelphia International Airport, the primary airport of Philadelphia, is a hub for domestic and international aviation.

Roads

Streets

Grid plan

The streets of Philadelphia mainly follow a grid plan, one of the first such lay-outs used in a North American city. The grid plan originated in 1682, when William Penn founded Philadelphia and appointed Thomas Holme as his surveyor. Using , Penn planned a system of organized streets to facilitate future growth. Since Penn survived the Great Fire of London and wanted to avoid similar catastrophes, he laid out streets wider than usual. Penn planned the city to stretch between the Delaware and Schuylkill Rivers, and his grid plan of present-day Center City followed a 22-by-8-block pattern. The plan included a large square in the center of the town (present day location of Philadelphia City Hall), and four public squares near each corner of the city.

Since the initial grid covered only the area of present-day Center City, other settlements such as Kensington developed using different grids. The grid system was gradually extended to other regions of present-day Philadelphia, although several roads predating a grid system still exist. Certain neighborhoods of Philadelphia, such as those in the Far Northeast, do not use grid systems.

Names

When the street grid was designed by Penn, he named the east-west streets after trees (although four have since been renamed), and assigned the north-south streets numbers, starting with Front Street by the Delaware River. Market Street, running east-west, and Broad Street, running north-south, are the arteries of Center City, and originate from a loop around Philadelphia City Hall.

The naming system of the streets differs by neighborhood, although the main north-south streets are numbered in South Philadelphia, West Philadelphia, and Lower North Philadelphia similar to how they are numbered in Center City. One example of a naming system is in South Philadelphia, where east-west streets use the surnames of former governors of Pennsylvania, starting with Reed Street and ending with Pattison Avenue. Several east-west streets in North Philadelphia are named after counties in Pennsylvania. Many other streets are named after locally or nationally significant people. During the 20th century, several streets were renamed to honor individuals, such as John F. Kennedy Boulevard.

Addresses
The system for assigning street addresses was enacted in 1858. In areas with a consistent grid, the street address numbers increase by intervals of 100s for each block, starting with Front Street for east-west streets and Market Street for north-south streets. For example, 1200 South Street would refer to the intersection of 12th & South Street, and 500 North 17th Street is 5 blocks north of Market Street.

Expressways

The main expressways of Philadelphia are the Delaware Expressway (I-95), which travels along the Delaware River, and the Schuylkill Expressway (I-76), paralleling the Schuylkill River for most of its route. Other expressways are the Vine Street Expressway (I-676), running between the Schuylkill Expressway and Delaware Expressway through downtown Philadelphia, the Roosevelt Expressway (US 1), a freeway portion of the Roosevelt Boulevard, and Woodhaven Road, an expressway connecting to I-95 to the south..

Bridges

Delaware River

Philadelphia is connected to New Jersey across the Delaware River by four bridges, three of which are maintained by the Delaware River Port Authority. The oldest is the Benjamin Franklin Bridge, which opened in 1926, and was the world's longest suspension bridge span until the opening of the Ambassador Bridge in 1929. The Benjamin Franklin Bridge connects Camden, New Jersey with Center City, thus making it a main crossing between Philadelphia and New Jersey. The Benjamin Franklin Bridge carries seven lanes of roadway, two rail lines of the PATCO Speedline, and two pedestrian walkways.

The longest bridge between Philadelphia and New Jersey is the Walt Whitman Bridge, which connects South Philadelphia to Gloucester City, New Jersey. The bridge carries seven lanes of I-76, and carries approximately 120,000 vehicles per day.

Connecting to Northeast Philadelphia are the Betsy Ross Bridge, a six-lane bridge linking the Bridesburg neighborhood of Philadelphia with Pennsauken, New Jersey, and the Tacony–Palmyra Bridge, a three-lane drawbridge spanning the Delaware River between the Tacony neighborhood of Philadelphia and Palmyra, New Jersey.

Schuylkill River

The Schuylkill River, a main tributary of the Delaware River, is crossed by 20 roads in Philadelphia. The oldest bridges were built and operated by private companies, and were initially wooden until the advent of iron and steel bridges. The Market Street Bridge, opened in 1805, was the first permanent bridge across the Schuylkill River. West Philadelphia has many bridges spanning across the Schuylkill River, including three expressways. University City is connected to Center City by five surface roads.

Pedestrians and bicycling

37% of Philadelphia workers commute without a car, compare to 33% for Chicago and 45% for San Francisco. According to a UC Berkeley study, 13 percent of Philadelphia households do not own a car. Philadelphia also has recently expanded their network of bike lanes and has implemented a bike sharing network, Indego which debuted on April 23, 2015 with 60 stations and 600 bikes.

Underground transit concourse

Philadelphia has a  underground transit concourse in Center City, which connects the SEPTA Regional Rail lines with local rail and trolley lines. Throughout the entire concourse are underground entrances to adjacent buildings, as well as the "MetroMarket," a group of small shops and eateries near Suburban Station. Within the underground concourse, it is possible to walk between 8th Street & Market and 18th Street & JFK Boulevard, or from City Hall to Locust Street.

Trails

Philadelphia has several multi-use river trails. A segment of the Schuylkill River Trail passes along the Schuylkill River from Locust Street northward to Valley Forge, near the King of Prussia mall. In Philadelphia, most of the trail runs through Fairmount Park. The trail to Valley Forge totals , and when completed, will total  to Hamburg, Pennsylvania.

The Wissahickon Trail branches off from the Schuylkill River Trail and runs along the Wissahickon Creek, terminating near Germantown Avenue. The Pennypack Trail runs along the Pennypack Creek, from the Delaware River to Fox Chase Farm. Sections of the Cobbs Creek and Tacony Creek also have trails.

Buses

SEPTA City buses

SEPTA lists 117 bus routes throughout Southeastern Pennsylvania, with most routes being within Philadelphia. Some of SEPTA's bus routes run 24 hours a day ("Night Owl" service), although most routes end by late night. SEPTA's bus service consists of its City Division routes within Philadelphia and parts of the suburbs and Suburban Division routes in the suburbs. The Suburban Division consists of the Victory ("Red Arrow") District for routes in Chester, Delaware, and Montgomery Counties, and the Frontier District for buses in Chester, Montgomery, and Bucks Counties. Other bus routes are its Regional Rail connector routes, the "Night Owl" bus service replacing the Market-Frankford and Broad Street subway lines during their closure, and other specialized services. SEPTA leases buses for third-party charter routes, and runs the charter buses for the School District of Philadelphia.

The City Transit Division runs 76 bus routes (including three trackless trolley routes), and the Suburban Division runs 44 bus routes. In 2009, SEPTA had a fleet of 1153 revenue buses for its City Transit Division, and 262 revenue buses for its Suburban Division.

SEPTA currently operates trackless trolleys on Routes 59, 66, and 75. Routes 59 and 75 are connected to the Market-Frankford Line at Arrott Transportation Center Station, near the terminus of the Market-Frankford Line. Route 59 travels primarily along Castor Avenue through Northeast Philadelphia, and terminates at the end of Castor Avenue, near Pennypack Park. Route 75 travels along Wyoming Avenue, and connects to Wyoming Station of the Broad Street Line, ending at Wayne Junction in Nicetown. Route 66 connects to the Market-Frankford Line at the Frankford Transportation Center, and extends along Frankford Avenue to the extremity of Northeast Philadelphia.

SEPTA formerly ran trackless trolleys along Routes 29 and 79 in South Philadelphia, but replaced those services with diesel buses in 2003.  In October 2006, the SEPTA board voted not to order additional vehicles for Routes 29 and 79, making them permanent diesel bus routes.

Intercity buses

The primary intercity bus station in Philadelphia is the Philadelphia Greyhound Terminal, located at 10th and Filbert Streets. Greyhound Lines operates its intercity buses from the Philadelphia Greyhound Terminal, which was the second busiest Greyhound bus station in the United States in 2008. Greyhound Lines operates one-seat bus rides to a variety of destinations, including Washington, New York, Atlantic City, St. Louis, and Atlanta, and provides connecting service to other destinations via transfers.

Other private companies which operate from the Greyhound Bus Terminal are Martz Trailways, Peter Pan Bus Lines, and Fullington Trailways. MegaBus and BoltBus, both discount bus lines, operate out of 30th Street Station. OurBus serves Philadelphia with various stops in the city. 

Chinatown buses, which travel between the Philadelphia Chinatown and Chinatowns in New York City and Washington, provide low-cost intercity bus service. In addition, China Airlines provides a private bus service to JFK International Airport in New York City to feed its flight to Taipei.

NJ Transit Philadelphia-New Jersey buses

NJ Transit operates 12 suburban bus routes to Burlington, Camden, and Gloucester Counties along with the 551 bus to Atlantic City from stops along Market Street in Center City. NJ Transit also operates the seasonal 316 express to Cape May. 

NJ Transit formerly operated the 313, 315, 317, 408, 409, and 551 buses from the Greyhound Bus Terminal. which serviced the New Jersey resort towns of Asbury Park, Atlantic City, and Cape May with intermediate stops throughout New Jersey. NJ Transit bus service to the bus terminal ended on February 28, 2022, with all routes but the 551 changed to start in Camden.

Railways

SEPTA
SEPTA is a regional public transportation authority that operates bus, rapid transit, commuter rail, light rail, and electric trolleybus services for nearly 4 million people in five counties in and around Philadelphia, Pennsylvania. It also manages projects that maintain, replace and expand its infrastructure, facilities and vehicles.

Subway lines

Philadelphia has the third oldest subway system in the United States, dating back to its opening in 1907. Operated by the Philadelphia Rapid Transit Company until 1939 and the Philadelphia Transportation Company until 1968, the SEPTA subway system consists of two rapid transit systems converging in Center City, and five surface level trolley lines operated in a shared subway through downtown Philadelphia.

Combined, the Market-Frankford Line and Broad Street Line have the sixth highest ridership of rapid transit systems in the United States, with a daily ridership of 316,253. Feeder trolley and bus systems connect to the terminals of the Market-Frankford Line. At 69th Street Transportation Center, the Norristown High Speed Line, SEPTA Route 101, and SEPTA Route 102 connect to nearby suburbs, and a large bus depot handles SEPTA suburban bus routes. Near the eastern terminus of the Market-Frankford Line, three trackless trolley lines and multiple diesel bus lines converge. In addition, several regional rail lines stop at the Fern Rock Transportation Center of the Broad Street Line.

Trolley

The Subway–Surface Trolley Lines are the remnants of an extensive pre-World War II streetcar system, similar to the Boston Green Line and San Francisco Muni Metro. The trolley lines were originally run by different companies, until their consolidation by the Philadelphia Rapid Transit Company in 1906. The trolleys run in a tunnel from the Drexel University and University of Pennsylvania campuses to a loop around City Hall. Unlike light rail systems with articulated vehicles, the trolley lines use vehicles closer in size to classic PCC streetcars.

Route 15, commonly known as the Girard Avenue Trolley, was restored in 2005 after having been operated with buses for 13 years. The 15 line runs along Girard Avenue through Greater Kensington, North Philadelphia, and West Philadelphia. The trolley utilizes restored PCC streetcars, a type of heritage trolley built in the 1930s. The trolleys were rebuilt with added air conditioning and regenerative braking. Route 15 is the only active trolley line in Philadelphia that is not part of the Subway-Surface Trolley Line system.

Regional Rail

SEPTA's Regional Rail division consists of 13 lines with 153 active stations, totaling  of trackage. Each line is named by their station terminals, with the exception of the Manayunk/Norristown Line. The core of the Regional Rail system is the Center City Commuter Connection, a four-track tunnel under Center City linking three downtown stations: 30th Street Station, Suburban Station, and Jefferson Station. The Center City Commuter Connection was opened in 1984, built to connect the stub ends of the Pennsylvania Railroad and the Reading Railroad commuter rail systems. All SEPTA trains stop at the three downtown stations, with the exception of the Cynwyd Line. Most trains stop at Temple University station, located on the eastern edge of the Temple University campus. Because the tunnel makes the through-routing of trains possible, most inbound trains from one line continue as outbound trains on another line.

PATCO Speedline

The PATCO Speedline is a grade-separated system linking Philadelphia to the cities of Camden, Haddonfield, and Lindenwold in New Jersey. The Speedline has a daily ridership of 38,000, and is the primary transit link between South Jersey and Philadelphia. It is operated by the Port Authority Transit Corporation, a subsidiary of the Delaware River Port Authority (DRPA), and is the only rail line in Philadelphia to operate 24 hours a day during the week. According to a study conducted by the Delaware Valley Regional Planning Commission, 95% of riders are New Jersey residents, and the Speedline carries 47% of New Jersey business commuters with jobs in Center City.

NJ Transit Atlantic City Line

NJ Transit operates the Atlantic City Line from 30th Street Station to Atlantic City, New Jersey. Historically run by the Pennsylvania-Reading Seashore Lines, the current line opened in 1989 by Amtrak as the "Gambler's Express" and has been operated solely by NJ Transit since 1996. The line has six intermediate stops in New Jersey, with 13-16 departures in each direction per day.

Amtrak Intercity Rail

Intercity train service is operated out of 30th Street Station by Amtrak. Amtrak runs most services along the electrified Northeast Corridor, serving a densely urbanized string of cities in the northeastern United States. Amtrak runs at least 53 trains each weekday on its busiest route: Philadelphia to New York City. Regular train service along the Northeast Corridor consists of the Acela Express, a high-speed train between Boston and Washington, and the Northeast Regional, a local service with northern terminals of either Boston, or Springfield, Massachusetts (using a diesel locomotive), and southern terminals of Washington, D.C., Newport News or Lynchburg, Virginia. Amtrak runs several long-distance rail routes along the Northeast Corridor, including night trains. Long-distance trains run primarily on tracks owned and maintained by private freight railroads, and serve 39 states including the District of Columbia.

Amtrak operates two routes along the Keystone Corridor, connecting Philadelphia to Harrisburg and Pittsburgh. The Keystone Corridor consists of two different segments: the section between Harrisburg and Philadelphia, and the segment west of Harrisburg to Pittsburgh. The eastern segment of the line, owned by Amtrak, is fully electrified and almost completely grade separated. The section west of Harrisburg is a heavy-duty freight railroad owned by Norfork Southern. Regular service on the Keystone Corridor consists of the Keystone Service, which travels between Harrisburg and Philadelphia. After stopping in Philadelphia, certain trains continue along the Northeast Corridor to New York. The western section traverses mountainous terrain, and has obstacles limiting track speeds such as the Horseshoe Curve. The Pennsylvanian, consisting of one train in each direction per day, is the only route between Philadelphia and Pittsburgh.

Frequent service routes

Daily and nightly routes

Water transportation

Philadelphia Naval Shipyard

The former Philadelphia Naval Shipyard is located at the confluence of the Delaware and Schuylkill Rivers. The facility was used as a shipyard for the U.S. Navy until the cessation of military activities on September 27, 1996. The Naval Yard saw extensive use during World War II, when the yard employed a peak of 58,434 civilians and built 53 ships, including the USS New Jersey and USS Wisconsin.

Aker Philadelphia Shipyard

After the conversion of the Naval Yard for civilian uses, the Norwegian company Kværner rebuilt the western facility for commercial shipbuilding operations in partnership with the City of Philadelphia. Now called the Aker Philadelphia Shipyard, the yard opened in 2000 and delivered its first vessel in 2003. The Aker Shipyard has built twelve ships, and has four vessels under construction.

Port of Philadelphia

Since 1990, The Port of Philadelphia has been operated by the Philadelphia Regional Port Authority, a state agency created to fund the port infrastructure. The busiest facility of the Port of Philadelphia is the Packer Avenue Marine Terminal, located north of the Walt Whitman Bridge. The facility is serviced by three class-one railroads: CP Rail, CSX, and Norfolk Southern, and is located in close proximity to I-95 and I-76. The Tioga Marine Terminal, located south of the Betsy Ross Bridge, has specialized equipment for handling Chilean fruit and Argentine juice. The Port of Philadelphia is one of the Strategic Military Ports of the U.S. Department of Defense, making it one of only 14 ports in the United States permitted to handle the nation's military cargo.

Cruise Ship Terminal
The Delaware River Port Authority operates a cruise ship terminal at Pier One of the Philadelphia Naval Business Center. No cruise lines are based at the terminal as of 2010, although two cruise lines have scheduled stops in Philadelphia. The terminal handled a peak of 35 sailings in 2006, when the Norwegian Majesty was based at the terminal before it was sold.

RiverLink Ferry

The RiverLink Ferry is a passenger ferry that connects Penn's Landing with the Camden, NJ waterfront across the Delaware River. The ferry provides a way for tourists to reach waterfront attractions on both sides of the river, and it is managed by Hornblower Marine Services for the Delaware River Port Authority.

Vehicles for hire
Uber entered the Philadelphia market in June 2012 as a chauffeured limousine service. UberX, which connects riders to drivers, began operating in Philadelphia in October 2014.

Public transportation statistics
The average amount of time people spend commuting with public transit in Philadelphia, for example to and from work, on a weekday is 93 min. 35% of public transit riders, ride for more than 2 hours every day. The average amount of time people wait at a stop or station for public transit is 16 min, while 27% of riders wait for over 20 minutes on average every day. The average distance people usually ride in a single trip with public transit is 10.3 km, while 27% travel for over 12 km in a single direction.

Aviation

Philadelphia International Airport

Philadelphia International Airport (PHL) is the largest airport in the Philadelphia region and the 11th busiest airport in the world in 2008 in terms of traffic movements. Most of PHL is located in Philadelphia proper, while the international terminal and the western end of the airfield are located in Tinicum Township. Philadelphia International Airport is a domestic hub and the primary international hub of American Airlines. American Airlines uses Terminal A West, the international terminal, for flights to Europe and the Caribbean. Terminals B and C are used exclusively for domestic American Airlines flights, and American Eagle regional flights use Terminal F. Southwest Airlines, a major domestic low-cost airline, began flights to PHL in 2004 despite its business model of utilizing secondary airports. Southwest Airlines operates its flights from Terminal E along with several other airlines. UPS Airlines operates a regional freight hub at the airport.

PHL is connected to Center City by the SEPTA Airport Line, which has four stations throughout the airport and travels to 30th Street Station, Suburban Station, and Jefferson Station in downtown Philadelphia. There is also taxi service to the airport.

Northeast Philadelphia Airport

Northeast Philadelphia Airport, located in the Ashton-Woodenbridge neighborhood of Northeast Philadelphia, is used for general aviation flights. It is the sixth busiest airport in Pennsylvania, and has two runways. In 2006, the airport had an average of 289 aircraft operations per day, and 203 aircraft based at the airport.

See also

History of rail transport in Philadelphia
Philadelphia Main Line

References

External links

SEPTA Official Website
Schedules
Clickable Rail System Map
Philadelphia International Airport
Philadelphia Department of Streets

 
Philadelphia, Pennsylvania